Inga chiapensis is a species of plant in the family Fabaceae. It is found only in Mexico.

References

chiapensis
Endemic flora of Mexico
Flora of Chiapas
Taxonomy articles created by Polbot